This is a list of 698 species in Chrysobothris, a genus of metallic wood-boring beetles in the family Buprestidae.

Chrysobothris species

 Chrysobothris abyssinica Fairmaire, 1891 c g
 Chrysobothris acaciae Knull, 1936 i c g b
 Chrysobothris achardi Obenberger, 1922 c g
 Chrysobothris acutipennis Chevrolat, 1835 i c g b
 Chrysobothris adelpha Harold, 1869 i c g b
 Chrysobothris aeneicollis Deyrolle, 1864 c g
 Chrysobothris aeneifrons Fairmaire, 1882 c g
 Chrysobothris aeneola LeConte, 1860 i c g
 Chrysobothris aequalis Waterhouse, 1889 c g
 Chrysobothris aerea Chevrolat, 1834 c g
 Chrysobothris affinis (Fabricius, 1794) c g
 Chrysobothris alabamae Gory, 1841
 Chrysobothris alabamaegory , 1841 c g
 Chrysobothris alecto Obenberger, 1917 c g
 Chrysobothris algoensis Obenberger, 1922 c g
 Chrysobothris alluaudi Kerremans, 1914 c g
 Chrysobothris alutaceiventris Obenberger, 1940 c g
 Chrysobothris amazonica Kerremans, 1897 c g
 Chrysobothris amberestris Bellamy, 1999 c g
 Chrysobothris amplicollis Thomson, 1879 c g
 Chrysobothris amurensis Pic, 1904 c g
 Chrysobothris analis LeConte, 1860 i c g b
 Chrysobothris andamana Kerremans, 1891 c g
 Chrysobothris andica Obenberger, 1928 c g
 Chrysobothris andrewsi Waterhouse, 1900 c g
 Chrysobothris andrusi Baudon, 1968 c g
 Chrysobothris angolae Obenberger, 1922 c g
 Chrysobothris angulipicta Kerremans, 1903 c g
 Chrysobothris anniae Obenberger, 1928 c g
 Chrysobothris anoguttata (Gory, 1841) c g
 Chrysobothris antillarum Fisher, 1925 c g
 Chrysobothris antiqua Chevrolat, 1838 c g
 Chrysobothris apicalis Kerremans, 1900 c g
 Chrysobothris apolinari Obenberger, 1932 c g
 Chrysobothris ardoini Baudon, 1963 c g
 Chrysobothris arizonica Chamberlin, 1938 i c g
 Chrysobothris armata Dugès, 1891 c g
 Chrysobothris arnoldi Thery, 1932 c g
 Chrysobothris arouensis Deyrolle, 1864 c g
 Chrysobothris astartae Abeille de Perrin, 1895 c g
 Chrysobothris astuta Waterhouse, 1887 c g
 Chrysobothris atabalipa Gory & Laporte, 1837 c g
 Chrysobothris atahualpa Obenberger, 1928 c g
 Chrysobothris aterrima Kerremans, 1899 c g
 Chrysobothris atriplexae Fisher, 1942 i c g
 Chrysobothris auricincta Burmeister, 1872 c g
 Chrysobothris auricollis Kerremans, 1898 c g
 Chrysobothris auricornis Deyrolle, 1864 c g
 Chrysobothris aurifera Kirsch, 1866 c g
 Chrysobothris auripes Gory & Laporte, 1837 c g
 Chrysobothris auroimpressa Gory, 1841 c g
 Chrysobothris auropicta Kerremans, 1897 c g
 Chrysobothris auropunctata Deyrolle, 1864 c g
 Chrysobothris australasiae Hope, 1846 c g
 Chrysobothris axillaris Horn, 1886 i c g
 Chrysobothris azurea LeConte, 1857 i c g b
 Chrysobothris bacchari Van Dyke, 1923 i c g b  (coyote bush buprestid)
 Chrysobothris badeni Théry, 1925 c g
 Chrysobothris ballae Whalley & Jarzembowski, 1985 c g
 Chrysobothris balzani Obenberger, 1922 c g
 Chrysobothris banghaasi Théry, 1911 c g
 Chrysobothris barellei Bourgoin, 1922 c g
 Chrysobothris barri Wescott, 1971 i c g
 Chrysobothris basalis LeConte, 1858 i c g b
 Chrysobothris beameri Knull, 1954 i c g b
 Chrysobothris beckeri Obenberger, 1956 c g
 Chrysobothris bedeli Obenberger, 1922 c g
 Chrysobothris behanzini Obenberger, 1940 c g
 Chrysobothris bekassana Obenberger, 1932 c g
 Chrysobothris bella Fisher, 1925 c g
 Chrysobothris bellata Thomson, 1879 c g
 Chrysobothris belti Waterhouse, 1887 c g
 Chrysobothris beniensis Fisher, 1925 c g
 Chrysobothris beyeri Schaeffer, 1904 i c g b
 Chrysobothris bicentra Obenberger, 1940 c g
 Chrysobothris bicolor Horn, 1894 i c g
 Chrysobothris bicolorata Bílý, 2000 c g
 Chrysobothris bicolorifrons Obenberger, 1940 c g
 Chrysobothris bicornis Gory & Laporte, 1837 c g
 Chrysobothris biimpressa (Chevrolat, 1838) c g
 Chrysobothris bilyi Bellamy, 1998 c g
 Chrysobothris bimarginicollis Schaeffer, 1905 i c g b
 Chrysobothris bisinuata Chamberlin, 1938 i c g
 Chrysobothris bispinosa Schaeffer, 1909 i c g b
 Chrysobothris bistripunctata Deyrolle, 1864 c g
 Chrysobothris boharti Van Dyke, 1934 i c g
 Chrysobothris boliviae Obenberger, 1924 c g
 Chrysobothris boliviana Kerremans, 1897 c g
 Chrysobothris boninensis Kurosawa, 1975 c g
 Chrysobothris borneensis Kerremans, 1900 c g
 Chrysobothris bothrideres Fairmaire, 1864 c g
 Chrysobothris bouddah Théry, 1940 c g
 Chrysobothris brahma Obenberger, 1917 c g
 Chrysobothris braunsi Obenberger, 1922 c g
 Chrysobothris breviloba Fall, 1910 i c g b
 Chrysobothris breviloboides Barr, 1969 i c g
 Chrysobothris brevitarsis Nelson, 1975 c g
 Chrysobothris brixi Baudon, 1963 c g
 Chrysobothris bruchi Obenberger, 1928 c g
 Chrysobothris buenavistae Obenberger, 1928 c g
 Chrysobothris bumburetica Bílý, 2000 c g
 Chrysobothris buqueti Obenberger, 1922 c g
 Chrysobothris burgeoni Obenberger, 1924 c g
 Chrysobothris caddo Wellso & Manley, 2007 i c g b
 Chrysobothris caelata Carter, 1925 c g
 Chrysobothris californica LeConte, 1860 i c g b
 Chrysobothris callichroma Obenberger, 1939 c g
 Chrysobothris capensis Kerremans, 1893 c g
 Chrysobothris capitata Gory & Laporte, 1837 c g
 Chrysobothris carbonaria Gory & Laporte, 1837 c g
 Chrysobothris carbonicolor Obenberger, 1922 c g
 Chrysobothris carbunculifer Théry, 1911 c g
 Chrysobothris carinata Kerremans, 1892 c g
 Chrysobothris carinipennis LeConte, 1878 i c g b
 Chrysobothris carmelita Fall, 1907 i c g
 Chrysobothris carminea Kerremans, 1900 c g
 Chrysobothris carneola (Voet, 1806) c g
 Chrysobothris carteri Obenberger, 1923 c g
 Chrysobothris cashmirensis Obenberger, 1934 c g
 Chrysobothris catascopa Thomson, 1879 c g
 Chrysobothris catharinae Obenberger, 1940 c g
 Chrysobothris caurina Horn, 1886 i c g b
 Chrysobothris cavatifrons Obenberger, 1940 c g
 Chrysobothris cavifrons Deyrolle, 1864 c g
 Chrysobothris chactas Gory & Laporte, 1837 c g
 Chrysobothris chalcophana (Klug, 1829) c g
 Chrysobothris chalcophoroides Horn, 1886 i c g b  (sculptured oak borer)
 Chrysobothris chalybea Gory & Laporte, 1837 c g
 Chrysobothris chamberliniana Fisher, 1948 i c g
 Chrysobothris cheni Théry, 1940 c g
 Chrysobothris chiribiquetensis Bellamy, 1995 c g
 Chrysobothris chiricahuae Knull, 1937 i c g
 Chrysobothris chiriquita Obenberger g
 Chrysobothris chlorocephala Gory, 1841 i c g b
 Chrysobothris chlorosticta Thomson, 1878 c g
 Chrysobothris chrysoela (Illiger, 1800) i c g b
 Chrysobothris chrysogaster Bourgoin, 1922 c g
 Chrysobothris chrysonota Deyrolle, 1864 c g
 Chrysobothris chrysostigma (Linnaeus, 1758) c g
 Chrysobothris chuckbellamyi Westcott, 2014 g
 Chrysobothris cincta Kerremans, 1893 c g
 Chrysobothris circe Obenberger, 1940 c g
 Chrysobothris circuloimpressa Deyrolle, 1864 c g
 Chrysobothris coelicolor Obenberger, 1922 c g
 Chrysobothris coeruleoglabrata Obenberger, 1917 c g
 Chrysobothris collaris Deyrolle, 1864 c g
 Chrysobothris coloradensis Wickham, 1914 c g
 Chrysobothris comanche Wellso & Manley, 2007 i c g b
 Chrysobothris confusa Deyrolle, 1864 c g
 Chrysobothris congeneratrix Obenberger, 1934 c g
 Chrysobothris consanguinea (Gory & Laporte, 1837)
 Chrysobothris consimilis (Gory, 1841) c g
 Chrysobothris convexa Fall, 1907 i c g
 Chrysobothris convexiuscula Waterhouse, 1887 c g
 Chrysobothris cordicollis Gory & Laporte, 1837 c g
 Chrysobothris cordillerae Obenberger, 1928 c g
 Chrysobothris cordovensis Gory & Laporte, 1837 c g
 Chrysobothris cornifrons Obenberger, 1940 c g
 Chrysobothris cornigera Fisher, 1944 c g
 Chrysobothris cornuta Kerremans, 1903 c g
 Chrysobothris corporaali Obenberger, 1922
 Chrysobothris costaricana Obenberger, 1917 c g
 Chrysobothris costata Kerremans, 1895 c g
 Chrysobothris costifer Kerremans, 1909 c g
 Chrysobothris costifrons Waterhouse, 1887 i c g b
 Chrysobothris crandalli Knull, 1943 i c g b
 Chrysobothris crenulipyga Obenberger, 1924 c g
 Chrysobothris cribifrons Thomson, 1879 g
 Chrysobothris cribraria Mannerheim, 1837 i c g b
 Chrysobothris cribrifrons Thomson, 1879 c g
 Chrysobothris cubensis Théry, 1927 c g
 Chrysobothris culbersoniana Knull, 1943 i c g
 Chrysobothris cunctans Obenberger, 1924 c g
 Chrysobothris cuprascens LeConte, 1860 i c g b
 Chrysobothris cupreipes Fairmaire, 1864 c g
 Chrysobothris cupreomactata Obenberger, 1928 c g
 Chrysobothris cupressicona Barr & Westcott, 1976 i c g b  (flatheaded cypress cone borer)
 Chrysobothris cupriceps Deyrolle, 1864 c g
 Chrysobothris cupricollis Deyrolle, 1864 c g
 Chrysobothris cuprifrons Fisher, 1925 c g
 Chrysobothris cuprina (Klug, 1829) c g
 Chrysobothris cupriventris Thomson, 1878 c g
 Chrysobothris curlettii Magnani, 1995 c g
 Chrysobothris curta Kerremans, 1893 c g
 Chrysobothris curvicollis Kerremans, 1900 c g
 Chrysobothris cyanella Horn, 1886 i c g b
 Chrysobothris cyanescens Deyrolle, 1864 c g
 Chrysobothris cyanicollis Gory & Laporte, 1837 c g
 Chrysobothris cyanipennis Deyrolle, 1864 c g
 Chrysobothris cypria Magnani, 1993 c g
 Chrysobothris danae Obenberger, 1940 c g
 Chrysobothris debilis LeConte, 1860 i c g
 Chrysobothris decolorata (Gory & Laporte, 1837) c g
 Chrysobothris deflexicornis Gory & Laporte, 1837 c g
 Chrysobothris delavayi Fairmaire, 1887 c g
 Chrysobothris delectabilis Waterhouse, 1889 c g
 Chrysobothris delenifica Deyrolle, 1864
 Chrysobothris deliana Kerremans, 1900 c g
 Chrysobothris densa Waterhouse, 1889 c g
 Chrysobothris densepunctata Obenberger, 1940 c g
 Chrysobothris dentipes (Germar, 1824) i c g b
 Chrysobothris deserta Horn, 1886 i c g b
 Chrysobothris desmaresti (Laporte & Gory, 1836) c g
 Chrysobothris deuvei Baudon, 1963 c g
 Chrysobothris deyrollei Thomson, 1858 c g
 Chrysobothris dilaticollis Kerremans, 1897 c g
 Chrysobothris discedens Gemminger & Harold, 1869 c g
 Chrysobothris discicollis Saunders, 1867 c g
 Chrysobothris disparicollis Thomson, 1879 c g
 Chrysobothris distincta Gory, 1841 i c g
 Chrysobothris dolata Horn, 1886 i c g b
 Chrysobothris dorbignyi (Gory, 1841) c g
 Chrysobothris dorsata (Fabricius, 1787) c g
 Chrysobothris dubiosula Obenberger, 1928 c g
 Chrysobothris dudichi Gebhardt, 1926 c g
 Chrysobothris dudleyaphaga Wescott, 2007 i c g
 Chrysobothris dugesi Kerremans, 1897 c g
 Chrysobothris duplicata (Chevrolat, 1838) c g
 Chrysobothris duporti Bourgoin, 1922 c g
 Chrysobothris dyopatra Gory, 1841 c g
 Chrysobothris dyoti Théry, 1925 c g
 Chrysobothris ebenina Théry, 1925 c g
 Chrysobothris ecuadorica Obenberger, 1928 c g
 Chrysobothris edwardsii Horn, 1886 i c g b
 Chrysobothris elevata Gory & Laporte, 1837 c g
 Chrysobothris ellyptica Deyrolle, 1864 c g
 Chrysobothris elongata Deyrolle, 1864 c g
 Chrysobothris emarginaticollis Blanchard, 1846 c g
 Chrysobothris embriki Obenberger, 1932 c g
 Chrysobothris empyrea Gerstäcker, 1871 c g
 Chrysobothris eos Obenberger, 1924 c g
 Chrysobothris ephedrae Knull, 1942 i c g b
 Chrysobothris eriogoni Wescott, 2005 i c g b
 Chrysobothris errans Gory, 1841 c g
 Chrysobothris erudita Hoscheck, 1931 c g
 Chrysobothris erythraeina Obenberger, 1940 c g
 Chrysobothris erythrogona (Kirsch, 1866) c g
 Chrysobothris eurycephala Obenberger, 1934 c g
 Chrysobothris exesa LeConte, 1858 i c g b
 Chrysobothris explicationis Nelson, 1975 c g
 Chrysobothris fabricii Saunders, 1871 c g
 Chrysobothris fabulosa Nelson, 1988 c g
 Chrysobothris facialis Hoscheck, 1931 c g
 Chrysobothris falli Van Dyke, 1918 i c g
 Chrysobothris fastidiosa Gory, 1841 c g
 Chrysobothris fatalis Harold, 1878 c g
 Chrysobothris felixi Gebhardt, 1926 c g
 Chrysobothris femorata (Olivier, 1790) i c g b  (flatheaded appletree borer)
 Chrysobothris fiji Bellamy, 2009 c g
 Chrysobothris fisheri Théry, 1927 c g
 Chrysobothris fisheriana Obenberger, 1928 c g
 Chrysobothris fiskei Fisher, 1942 i c g b
 Chrysobothris fluvialis Moore, 1986 c g
 Chrysobothris fossifrons Kerremans, 1892 c g
 Chrysobothris foveata Waterhouse, 1887 c g
 Chrysobothris foveiceps Saunders, 1867 c g
 Chrysobothris foveicollis Kerremans, 1893 c g
 Chrysobothris fragariae Fisher, 1930 i c g
 Chrysobothris francoisi Baudon, 1966 c g
 Chrysobothris fraudi Théry, 1931 c g
 Chrysobothris freyi (Pochon, 1972) c g
 Chrysobothris frontalis (Olivier, 1790) c g
 Chrysobothris fronticornis (Chevrolat, 1838) c g
 Chrysobothris frontiscalla Domínguez & Márquez, 1971 c g
 Chrysobothris fruta Gory, 1841 c g
 Chrysobothris funeraria Obenberger, 1922 c g
 Chrysobothris furcata Kerremans, 1913 c g
 Chrysobothris gahani Cockerell, 1911 c g
 Chrysobothris gardneri Théry, 1930 c g
 Chrysobothris gardnerianus Descarpentries, 1959 c g
 Chrysobothris gebhardti Théry, 1936 c g
 Chrysobothris gebieni Kerremans, 1914 c g
 Chrysobothris gedyei Théry, 1941 c g
 Chrysobothris gelhardtiana Théry, 1941 c g
 Chrysobothris gemmata LeConte, 1858 i c g b
 Chrysobothris generosa Gory & Laporte, 1837 c g
 Chrysobothris gentilis Kerremans, 1897 c g
 Chrysobothris georgei Nelson, 1980 c g
 Chrysobothris gerstmeier Barries, 2010 c g
 Chrysobothris ghesquierei Théry, 1940 c g
 Chrysobothris gloriosa Fisher, 1922 c g
 Chrysobothris gounellei Kerremans, 1897 c g
 Chrysobothris gowdeyi Fisher, 1928 c g
 Chrysobothris grancanariae Niehuis & Gottwald, 1999 c g
 Chrysobothris gratiosa Gory, 1841 c g
 Chrysobothris graueri Kerremans, 1914 c g
 Chrysobothris gravenhorsti Obenberger, 1922 c g
 Chrysobothris grindeliae Van Dyke, 1937 i c g
 Chrysobothris guadeloupensis Descarpentries, 1981 g
 Chrysobothris guatemalensis Thomson, 1878 c g
 Chrysobothris guineensis Obenberger, 1940 c g
 Chrysobothris guttata (Olivier, 1790) c g
 Chrysobothris guyanensis Thomson, 1879 c g
 Chrysobothris haitiensis Fisher, 1930 c g
 Chrysobothris handschini Obenberger, 1940 c g
 Chrysobothris harrisi (Hentz, 1827) i b
 Chrysobothris hauseri Obenberger, 1928 c g
 Chrysobothris haydeni Scudder, 1876 c g
 Chrysobothris helferi Fisher, 1942 i c g
 Chrysobothris hera Obenberger, 1924 c g
 Chrysobothris hexastigma Mannerheim, 1837 c g
 Chrysobothris heyrovskyi Obenberger, 1922 c g
 Chrysobothris hidalgoensis Knull, 1951 i c g
 Chrysobothris hispaniolae Fisher, 1925 c g
 Chrysobothris hobsoni Baudon, 1963 c g
 Chrysobothris holochalcea Burmeister, 1872 c g
 Chrysobothris holynskii Barries, 2011 c g
 Chrysobothris horaki Barries, 2008 c g
 Chrysobothris horni Kerremans, 1903 c g
 Chrysobothris horningi Barr, 1969 i c g
 Chrysobothris horvathi Gebhardt, 1926 c g
 Chrysobothris hoscheki Théry, 1925 c g
 Chrysobothris hubbardi Fisher, 1942 i c g b
 Chrysobothris humilis Horn, 1886 i c g b
 Chrysobothris hypochloris Erichson, 1847 c g
 Chrysobothris ianthinipes Obenberger, 1928 c g
 Chrysobothris ichthyomorpha Thomson, 1879 c g
 Chrysobothris idahoensis Barr, 1969 i c g
 Chrysobothris igai Kurosawa, 1948 c g
 Chrysobothris ignicollis Horn, 1885 i c g b
 Chrysobothris ignipicta Kerremans, 1900
 Chrysobothris ignisternum Obenberger, 1924 c g
 Chrysobothris igniventris Reitter, 1895 c g
 Chrysobothris ignota Dugès, 1891 c g
 Chrysobothris inaequalicollis Thomson, 1878 c g
 Chrysobothris inaequalis Waterhouse, 1887 c g
 Chrysobothris indica Castelnau and Gory, 1837 i c g
 Chrysobothris indigacea Kerremans, 1893 c g
 Chrysobothris infantula Obenberger, 1940 c g
 Chrysobothris infima Kerremans, 1893 c g
 Chrysobothris infranitens Kerremans, 1912 c g
 Chrysobothris insidiosa Waterhouse, 1887 c g
 Chrysobothris insolata Deyrolle, 1864 c g
 Chrysobothris insulana Fisher, 1925 c g
 Chrysobothris iridea Kerremans, 1900 c g
 Chrysobothris iris Van Dyke, 1937 i c g
 Chrysobothris jakovlevi Semenov, 1891 c g
 Chrysobothris jania Lotte, 1938 c g
 Chrysobothris janthina (Gory, 1841) c g
 Chrysobothris javae Obenberger, 1932 c g
 Chrysobothris javana Thomson, 1879 c g
 Chrysobothris jeanneli Obenberger, 1928 c g
 Chrysobothris jendeki Barries, 2006 c g
 Chrysobothris joellae Bleuzen, 1993 c g
 Chrysobothris juncta Waterhouse, 1887 c g
 Chrysobothris kabakovi Alexeev in Alexeev, et al., 1991 c g
 Chrysobothris kalaharica Obenberger, 1940 c g
 Chrysobothris kalshoveni Obenberger, 1931
 Chrysobothris kelloggi Knull, 1937 i c g
 Chrysobothris keyensis Gestro, 1877 c g
 Chrysobothris kiangsuanus Théry, 1940 c g
 Chrysobothris knulli Nelson, 1975 i c g b  (Knull's chrysobothris)
 Chrysobothris komareki Obenberger, 1928 c g
 Chrysobothris kordofana Obenberger, 1928 c g
 Chrysobothris kotoensis Miwa & Chûjô, 1940 c g
 Chrysobothris kraatzi Kerremans, 1899 c g
 Chrysobothris kucerai Barries, 2008 c g
 Chrysobothris kuntzeni Hoscheck, 1931 c g
 Chrysobothris labaili Baudon, 1968 c g
 Chrysobothris lancii Gory & Laporte, 1837 c g
 Chrysobothris lanei Théry, 1936 c g
 Chrysobothris laosensis Obenberger, 1928
 Chrysobothris laricis Van Dyke, 1916 i c g
 Chrysobothris lateralis Waterhouse, 1887 i c g b
 Chrysobothris laticollis Burmeister, 1872 c g
 Chrysobothris latifrons Deyrolle, 1864 c g
 Chrysobothris lativertex Obenberger, 1940 c g
 Chrysobothris laudabilis Théry, 1936 c g
 Chrysobothris leechi Barr, 1974 i c g b
 Chrysobothris legorskyi Barries, 2012 c g
 Chrysobothris leonhardi Obenberger, 1916 c g
 Chrysobothris lepida Gory & Laporte, 1837 c g
 Chrysobothris lesnei Théry, 1934 c g
 Chrysobothris lesueuri Gory & Laporte, 1837 c g
 Chrysobothris leuconoe Obenberger, 1940 c g
 Chrysobothris libanonica Obenberger, 1935 c g
 Chrysobothris libonoti Horn, 1886 i c g b
 Chrysobothris lilaceous Chamberlin, 1925 i c g
 Chrysobothris lineatipennis Van Dyke, 1916 i c g
 Chrysobothris linnei Obenberger, 1922 c g
 Chrysobothris lixa Horn, 1886 i c g b
 Chrysobothris lobata Kerremans, 1897 c g
 Chrysobothris longula Saunders, 1867 c g
 Chrysobothris lucana Horn, 1894 i c g b
 Chrysobothris lucifera Théry, 1911 c g
 Chrysobothris ludificata Horn, 1886 i c g b
 Chrysobothris macarthuri Théry, 1941 c g
 Chrysobothris macleayi Obenberger, 1928 c g
 Chrysobothris maculata Gory & Laporte, 1837 c g
 Chrysobothris maculicollis Thomson, 1878 c g
 Chrysobothris maculicoxis Obenberger, 1940 c g
 Chrysobothris maculiventris (Chevrolat, 1838) c g
 Chrysobothris maillei Gory & Laporte, 1837 c g
 Chrysobothris malayensis Fisher, 1930 c g
 Chrysobothris mali Horn, 1886 i c g b  (Pacific flatheaded borer)
 Chrysobothris manchurica Arakawa, 1932 c g
 Chrysobothris mandarina Théry, 1940 c g
 Chrysobothris manifesta Obenberger, 1940 c g
 Chrysobothris maracaensis Théry, 1925 c g
 Chrysobothris marina Abeille de Perrin, 1907 c g
 Chrysobothris marquesana Obenberger, 1928 c g
 Chrysobothris martha Van Dyke, 1942 c g
 Chrysobothris mastersii Macleay, 1872 c g
 Chrysobothris matangana Kerremans, 1912 c g
 Chrysobothris megacephala Gory & Laporte, 1837 c g
 Chrysobothris melazona Chevrolat, 1835 c g
 Chrysobothris merkelii Horn, 1886 i c g b  (merkel buprestid)
 Chrysobothris mescalero Wellso & Manley, 2007 i c g b
 Chrysobothris michelbacheri Van Dyke, 1942 c g
 Chrysobothris micromorpha Fall, 1907 i c g
 Chrysobothris microstigma Gestro, 1877 c g
 Chrysobothris militaris Deyrolle, 1864 c g
 Chrysobothris minuta Kerremans, 1896 c g
 Chrysobothris miraculosa Obenberger, 1928 c g
 Chrysobothris modesta Waterhouse, 1887 c g
 Chrysobothris mokrzeckii Obenberger, 1928 c g
 Chrysobothris moluccana Hoscheck, 1931 c g
 Chrysobothris montezuma Obenberger, 1940 c g
 Chrysobothris monticola Fall, 1910 i c g b
 Chrysobothris montrouzieri Kerremans, 1892 c g
 Chrysobothris mrazi Obenberger, 1924 c g
 Chrysobothris muehlei Barries, 2008 c g
 Chrysobothris mulsanti Obenberger, 1922 c g
 Chrysobothris multistigmosa (Mannerheim, 1837) c g
 Chrysobothris musae Théry, 1904 c g
 Chrysobothris myia Gory, 1841 c g
 Chrysobothris myoptica Obenberger, 1940 c g
 Chrysobothris nana Fairmaire, 1892 c g
 Chrysobothris natalensis Théry, 1925 c g
 Chrysobothris nausicaa Thomson, 1879 c g
 Chrysobothris nelsoni Westcott & Alten, 2006 i c g b
 Chrysobothris neopusilla Fisher, 1942 i c g b
 Chrysobothris neotexana Dozier, 1955 i c g b
 Chrysobothris nicaraguensis Obenberger, 1928 c g
 Chrysobothris nickerli Obenberger, 1922 c g
 Chrysobothris nigripennis Deyrolle, 1864 c g
 Chrysobothris nigrita Kerremans, 1893 c g
 Chrysobothris nigriventris Théry, 1928 c g
 Chrysobothris nigropicta Nelson, 1988 c g
 Chrysobothris nigroviolacea Deyrolle, 1864 c g
 Chrysobothris nisatoi Barries, 2011 c g
 Chrysobothris niveifrons Obenberger, 1928 c g
 Chrysobothris nixa Horn, 1886 i c g b  (flatheaded cedar borer)
 Chrysobothris nobilis (Fabricius, 1787) c g
 Chrysobothris nodipennis Kerremans, 1899 c g
 Chrysobothris obenbergeri Gebhardt, 1926 c g
 Chrysobothris occidentis Obenberger, 1922 c g
 Chrysobothris occipitalis Deyrolle, 1864 c g
 Chrysobothris octocola LeConte, 1858 i c g b
 Chrysobothris octofoveolata Thomson, 1879 c g
 Chrysobothris octomaculata Carter, 1925 c g
 Chrysobothris octonotata Saunders, 1874 c g
 Chrysobothris ohbayashii Kurosawa, 1948 c g
 Chrysobothris ohnoi Kurosawa, 1975 c g
 Chrysobothris okorosawana Obenberger, 1940 c g
 Chrysobothris omurai Baudon, 1968 c g
 Chrysobothris oregona Chamberlin, 1934 i c g
 Chrysobothris orono Frost, 1920 i c g b
 Chrysobothris orothi Baudon, 1963 c g
 Chrysobothris ovalis Kerremans, 1903 c g
 Chrysobothris palaui Cobos, 1954 c g
 Chrysobothris palawanensis Barries, 2006 c g
 Chrysobothris pampas Thomson, 1879 c g
 Chrysobothris pantochlora Guérin-Méneville, 1847 c g
 Chrysobothris paragrindeliae Knull, 1943 i c g
 Chrysobothris paraguayensis Obenberger, 1917 c g
 Chrysobothris parallela Deyrolle, 1864 c g
 Chrysobothris paramodesta Nelson, 1975 c g
 Chrysobothris parapiuta Knull, 1938 i c g
 Chrysobothris paratabalipa Nelson, 1975 c g
 Chrysobothris pardensis Kerremans, 1903 c g
 Chrysobothris parvipunctata Obenberger, 1914 c g
 Chrysobothris parvofoveata Fisher, 1925 c g
 Chrysobothris paulensis Théry, 1936 c g
 Chrysobothris pedroi Obenberger, 1940 c g
 Chrysobothris peninsularis Schaeffer, 1904 i c g b
 Chrysobothris peringueyi Théry, 1925 c g
 Chrysobothris perplexa Deyrolle, 1864 c g
 Chrysobothris perroni Gory & Laporte, 1837 c g
 Chrysobothris peruviae Obenberger, 1924 c g
 Chrysobothris petersoni Hawkeswood, 1997 c g
 Chrysobothris philippinensis Saunders, 1874 c g
 Chrysobothris phoebe Thomson, 1878 c g
 Chrysobothris picipes Kerremans, 1893 c g
 Chrysobothris picklesi Théry, 1938 c g
 Chrysobothris pictiventris Saunders, 1874 c g
 Chrysobothris pilifrons Kerremans, 1893 c g
 Chrysobothris piuta Wickham, 1903 i c g b
 Chrysobothris placida Kerremans, 1897 c g
 Chrysobothris pluton Gory, 1841 c g
 Chrysobothris polita Kerremans, 1897 c g
 Chrysobothris polychrous Bílý, 1983 c g
 Chrysobothris polymetallichroma Westcott, 1998 c g
 Chrysobothris polyspilota Burmeister, 1872 c g
 Chrysobothris potentillae Barr, 1969 i c g
 Chrysobothris prasina Horn, 1886 i c g b
 Chrysobothris prava Obenberger, 1924 c g
 Chrysobothris preissi Obenberger, 1922 c g
 Chrysobothris pressli Obenberger, 1922 c g
 Chrysobothris pseudacutipennis Obenberger, 1940 i c g b
 Chrysobothris pseudinsularis Hoscheck, 1931 c g
 Chrysobothris pseudotsugae Van Dyke, 1916 i c g b
 Chrysobothris pubilineata Vogt, 1949 i c g b
 Chrysobothris puella Gory, 1841 c g
 Chrysobothris pulchella Gory & Laporte, 1837 c g
 Chrysobothris pulcherrima Snellen von Vollenhoven, 1864 c g
 Chrysobothris pulchra Gory & Laporte, 1837 c g
 Chrysobothris pulchripes Fairmaire, 1887 c g
 Chrysobothris pumpuna Blackwelder, 1944 c g
 Chrysobothris puncticollis Kerremans, 1897 c g
 Chrysobothris punctiventris Kerremans, 1897 c g
 Chrysobothris purpurata Bland, 1864 i c g
 Chrysobothris purpureicollis Kerremans, 1900
 Chrysobothris purpureoplagiata Schaeffer, 1904 i c g b
 Chrysobothris purpureovittata Horn, 1886 i c g b
 Chrysobothris purpurescens Kerremans, 1907 c g
 Chrysobothris purpurifrons Motschulsky, 1859 i c g
 Chrysobothris pusilla Gory & Laporte, 1837 i c g b
 Chrysobothris pygmaea Kerremans, 1897 c g
 Chrysobothris quadraticollis Kerremans, 1892 c g
 Chrysobothris quadriimpressa Gory & Laporte, 1837 c g b
 Chrysobothris quadrilineata LeConte, 1860 i c g b
 Chrysobothris quadrimaculata (Fabricius, 1776) c g
 Chrysobothris quadriplagiata Waterhouse, 1887 c g
 Chrysobothris queenslandica Hawkeswood, 1986 c g
 Chrysobothris ras Obenberger, 1940 c g
 Chrysobothris ravilla Obenberger, 1924 c g
 Chrysobothris regina Kerremans, 1898 c g
 Chrysobothris regradata Wallengren, 1881 c g
 Chrysobothris rejzeki Niehuis, 2009 c g
 Chrysobothris richteri Obenberger, 1928 c g
 Chrysobothris riedlei Barries, 2008 c g
 Chrysobothris riograndina Obenberger, 1940 c g
 Chrysobothris ritsemae Gestro, 1877 c g
 Chrysobothris rogaguaensis Fisher, 1925 c g
 Chrysobothris roguensis Beer, 1967 i c g
 Chrysobothris romeroi Westcott, 2014 g
 Chrysobothris rondoni Baudon, 1963 c g
 Chrysobothris roseiventris Thomson, 1878 c g
 Chrysobothris rossi Van Dyke, 1942 i c g b
 Chrysobothris rothkirchi Obenberger, 1922 c g
 Chrysobothris rotundicollis Gory & Laporte, 1837 i c g b
 Chrysobothris rubimaculata (Gory & Laporte, 1837) c g
 Chrysobothris rubripes Chevrolat, 1838 c g
 Chrysobothris rudipennis Kerremans, 1903 c g
 Chrysobothris rugifrons Kerremans, 1893 c g
 Chrysobothris rugipes Gory & Laporte, 1837 c g
 Chrysobothris rugosa Gory & Laporte, 1837 c g
 Chrysobothris rugosiceps Melsheimer, 1845 i c g b
 Chrysobothris rugosipennis Théry, 1947 c g
 Chrysobothris rutilans Kerremans, 1897 c g
 Chrysobothris rutilicuspis Heller, 1893 c g
 Chrysobothris sacrata Obenberger, 1924 c g
 Chrysobothris sadahiroi Barries, 2011 c g
 Chrysobothris salebrosa Kerremans, 1893 c g
 Chrysobothris saliaris Kurosawa, 1948 c g
 Chrysobothris sallaei Waterhouse, 1887 c g
 Chrysobothris salomonica Obenberger, 1922 c g
 Chrysobothris samai Curletti & Magnani, 1988 c g
 Chrysobothris samurai Obenberger, 1935 c g
 Chrysobothris sapphirina (Swartz, 1817) c g
 Chrysobothris saundersii Macleay, 1872 c g
 Chrysobothris sauteri Kerremans, 1912 c g
 Chrysobothris scabripennis Gory & Laporte, 1837 i c g b
 Chrysobothris schaefferi Obenberger, 1934 i c g
 Chrysobothris schistomorion Westcott and Davidson, 2001 i c g
 Chrysobothris schlueteri Théry, 1925 c g
 Chrysobothris schoutedeni Obenberger, 1921 c g
 Chrysobothris scintillatrix Obenberger, 1940 c g
 Chrysobothris scitula Gory, 1841 i c g b
 Chrysobothris seminole Wellso & Manley, 2007 i c g b
 Chrysobothris semisculpta LeConte, 1860 i c g b
 Chrysobothris semisuturalis (Kerremans, 1899) c g
 Chrysobothris sericeifrons Théry, 1898 c g
 Chrysobothris serripes Schaeffer, 1905 i c g
 Chrysobothris sexangula Kerremans, 1897 c g
 Chrysobothris sexfasciata Schaeffer, 1919 i c g b
 Chrysobothris seximpressa Mannerheim, 1837 c g
 Chrysobothris sexnotata Gory, 1841 c g
 Chrysobothris sexpunctata (Fabricius, 1801) c g
 Chrysobothris sexsignata Say, 1839 i c g b
 Chrysobothris sexstigmata Gory & Laporte, 1837 c g
 Chrysobothris shawnee Wellso & Manley, 2007 i c g b
 Chrysobothris shinanensis Kano, 1929 c g
 Chrysobothris shirakii Miwa & Chûjô, 1935 c g
 Chrysobothris shiwakii Miwa & Chujo, 1935 g
 Chrysobothris shortlandica Obenberger, 1928 c g
 Chrysobothris siamensis Hoscheck, 1931 c g
 Chrysobothris sibuyana Fisher, 1924 c g
 Chrysobothris similis Saunders, 1867 c g
 Chrysobothris simillima Obenberger, 1940 c g
 Chrysobothris simplex Waterhouse, 1887 c g
 Chrysobothris simplicifrons Kerremans, 1903 c g
 Chrysobothris sinensis Fairmaire, 1887 c g
 Chrysobothris singalesa Obenberger, 1922 c g
 Chrysobothris skalei Barries, 2010 c g
 Chrysobothris sloicola Manley & Wellso, 1976 i c g b
 Chrysobothris smaltzi Théry, 1911 c g
 Chrysobothris smaragdinea Kerremans, 1893 c g
 Chrysobothris smaragdula Fall, 1907 i c g
 Chrysobothris sobrina Dugès, 1891 c g
 Chrysobothris socialis Waterhouse, 1887 i c g
 Chrysobothris solieri Gory & Laporte, 1837 c g
 Chrysobothris somereni Théry, 1931 c g
 Chrysobothris soror Gory & Laporte, 1837 c g
 Chrysobothris speculifer Horn, 1886 i c g b
 Chrysobothris spinicollis Théry, 1911 c g
 Chrysobothris standa Barries, 2011 c g
 Chrysobothris staudingeri Kerremans, 1897 c g
 Chrysobothris steinbachi Obenberger, 1928 c g
 Chrysobothris stellifera Waterhouse, 1887 c g
 Chrysobothris stephensi Gory & Laporte, 1837 c g
 Chrysobothris sterbai Obenberger, 1932 c g
 Chrysobothris storkani Obenberger, 1940 c g
 Chrysobothris strandiana Obenberger, 1922 c g
 Chrysobothris stricklandi Obenberger, 1924 c g
 Chrysobothris strigicollis Théry, 1898 c g
 Chrysobothris subcylindrica Ménétries in Motschulsky, 1859 i c g b
 Chrysobothris subopaca Schaeffer, 1904 i c g
 Chrysobothris subrugosa Kerremans, 1903 c g
 Chrysobothris subsimilis Thomson, 1879 c g
 Chrysobothris succedanea Saunders, 1873 c g
 Chrysobothris sudanensis Obenberger, 1940 c g
 Chrysobothris sulci Obenberger, 1932 c g
 Chrysobothris sumbana Obenberger, 1932 c g
 Chrysobothris superba Deyrolle, 1864 c g
 Chrysobothris suppressa Wickham, 1914 c g
 Chrysobothris suturalis Walker, 1858 c g
 Chrysobothris sylvania Fall, 1910 i c g
 Chrysobothris taciturna Kerremans, 1897 c g
 Chrysobothris takahashii Barries, 2009 c g
 Chrysobothris tenebricosa Kerremans, 1897 c g
 Chrysobothris tessellata Westcott *in* Westcott, *et al*., 2008 c g
 Chrysobothris texana LeConte, 1860 i c g b
 Chrysobothris texcocana Domínguez, 1969 c g
 Chrysobothris thomae Kerremans, 1899 c g
 Chrysobothris thomsoni Waterhouse, 1887 c g
 Chrysobothris thoracica (Fabricius, 1798) c g
 Chrysobothris tibidens Domínguez & Márquez, 1971 c g
 Chrysobothris timida Kerremans, 1897 c g
 Chrysobothris tonkinensis Bourgoin, 1922 c g
 Chrysobothris totonaca Domínguez & Márquez, 1971 c g
 Chrysobothris tranquebarica (Gmelin, 1788) i c g b  (Australian pine borer)
 Chrysobothris transvalensis Obenberger, 1940 c g
 Chrysobothris tricolor Kerremans, 1892 c g
 Chrysobothris trinervia Kirby, 1837 i c g b
 Chrysobothris trisignata Waterhouse, 1887 c g
 Chrysobothris tristis Deyrolle, 1864 c g
 Chrysobothris trochantispina Domínguez & Márquez, 1971 c g
 Chrysobothris trochilus Waterhouse, 1887 c g
 Chrysobothris tumida Chevrolat, 1867 c g
 Chrysobothris umbrosa Kerremans, 1903 c g
 Chrysobothris umrongsoi Barries, 2007 c g
 Chrysobothris unica Deyrolle, 1864 c g
 Chrysobothris unigemmata Obenberger, 1922 c g
 Chrysobothris uruguayensis Obenberger, 1932 c g
 Chrysobothris ventralis Saunders, 1874 i c g
 Chrysobothris ventriplaga Obenberger, 1928 c g
 Chrysobothris venustula Gory & Laporte, 1837 c g
 Chrysobothris verdigripennis Frost, 1910 i c g b
 Chrysobothris verityi Nelson, 1975 c g
 Chrysobothris veselyi Obenberger, 1922 c g
 Chrysobothris vicina Kerremans, 1900 c g
 Chrysobothris vidua Fisher, 1930 c g
 Chrysobothris vilucana Obenberger, 1928 c g
 Chrysobothris violacea Kerremans, 1892 c g
 Chrysobothris violaceotincta Obenberger, 1922 c g
 Chrysobothris viridiceps Melsheimer, 1845 i c g b
 Chrysobothris viridicyanea Horn, 1886 i c g b
 Chrysobothris viridifasciata (Gory & Laporte, 1838) c g
 Chrysobothris viridiimpressa Gory & Laporte, 1837 c g
 Chrysobothris viridilabrata Obenberger, 1928 c g
 Chrysobothris viridinotata (Gory & Laporte, 1838) c g
 Chrysobothris viridis Macleay, 1872 c g
 Chrysobothris vitalisi Bourgoin, 1922 c g
 Chrysobothris vivida Knull, 1952 i c g
 Chrysobothris vulcanica LeConte, 1861 i c g b
 Chrysobothris vulgata Obenberger, 1928 c g
 Chrysobothris wagneri Kerremans, 1913 c g
 Chrysobothris wallacei Saunders, 1871 c g
 Chrysobothris waynei Bellamy, 1998 c g
 Chrysobothris weigeli Barries, 2011 c g
 Chrysobothris westcotti Barr, 1969 i c g b  (Westcott's flathead)
 Chrysobothris weyersi Kerremans, 1900 c g
 Chrysobothris wickhami Fisher, 1942 i c g
 Chrysobothris widdringtoniae Descarpentries, 1959 c g
 Chrysobothris wilkinsoni Théry, 1947 c g
 Chrysobothris williamsi Van Dyke, 1953 c g
 Chrysobothris wintu Wellso & Manley, 2007 i c g b
 Chrysobothris wolcotti Fisher, 1925 c g
 Chrysobothris woodgatei Champlain & Knull, 1922 i c g b
 Chrysobothris yemenensis Bílý, 2000 c g
 Chrysobothris yucatanensis Van Dyke, 1953 c g
 Chrysobothris yunnanensis Théry, 1940 c g
 Chrysobothris znojkoi Semenov & Richter, 1934 c g
 Chrysobothris zubaci Obenberger, 1932 c g

Data sources: i = ITIS, c = Catalogue of Life, g = GBIF, b = Bugguide.net

References

Chrysobothris